Weinmannia portlandiana is a species of plant in the family Cunoniaceae. It is endemic to Jamaica.  It is threatened by habitat loss.

References

portlandiana
Endemic flora of Jamaica
Trees of Jamaica
Taxonomy articles created by Polbot